Rosalyn Barton (born 12 December 1938) is a former Australian diver. She competed in the 1956 Melbourne Olympic Games.

Barton competed in the 1953 New South Wales state diving championships, winning the junior title and finishing second in the senior event. She was Australian women's junior champion diver in 1954 and 1955. Competing in the senior event in 1955, she finished third.

At the 1956 Melbourne Olympics Barton finished 15th in both the 3m springboard and the 10m platform.

Personal 
Barton's married name is Cooper.

References 

1938 births
Living people
Olympic divers of Australia
Divers at the 1956 Summer Olympics
Australian female divers
20th-century Australian women
21st-century Australian women